École secondaire Jules-Verne is a public francophone secondary school located in the South Cambie neighbourhood of Vancouver, British Columbia, Canada. Named after the French author, it is part of School District 93 (Conseil scolaire francophone). The school is one of the many schools in Vancouver that provide the IB Diploma Program.

History
Originally, students and staff of the school used to attend Kitsilano Secondary School in a separate program, which was intended to have all of its subjects taught in French. Despite the program's effort to provide all of its courses in French, many of the courses offered to students in grades 11 and 12 were done so strictly in English. Unlike the teachers of the regular Kitsilano academic program, the Francophone teachers were not given their own classrooms; they had to borrow them and needed to move teaching materials from one class to another.

As a result, the staff and the parents of the students felt that it was necessary for Kitsilano's Francophone students to get an all-French education in a separate school.  The construction of École Secondaire Jules-Verne began in spring 2007, and students were able to attend the school on September 8, 2008, of the following year. However, the construction of the school was not completed until the end of March 2009 and the school was officially open on April 4, 2009.

Campus 
Jules-Verne has two science labs, a music room with soundproof studios, a library, a large theatre that seats 200, a full-size gymnasium, an exercise room, a greenhouse, a home economics room and an art room that includes a pottery space. They equally have access to Oak Meadows for gym class and extracurriculars.

Services

Hot lunches 
The school offers hot lunches which are delivered to the school daily and are available for pre-purchase.

Technology 
All students at Jules-Verne are given access to a personal laptop computer (13-inch MacBook Air) as an educational tool for the remainder of their time at Jules-Verne. Students from grades 7 to 10 are not permitted to take their computers home. In grades 11 and 12, the students are given the privilege to take their laptops home as a tool to complete their school work. In addition, Jules-Verne issues an e-mail address for all students and staff. It has a library with computers for research assignments and communication, and Smart Boards in a number of classrooms.

Transportation 
As Jules-Verne is a destination school with students coming from Vancouver, Burnaby, New Westminster, North Vancouver and Richmond, Jules-Verne offers a school bus service (yellow bus) for grade 7 and grade 8 students living more than 1 km away from the school. Students in grades 8 to 12 living beyond a 3 km radius and in the school's attendance area receive a monthly public transit pass: the compass card.

Special programs

IB Diploma 
École secondaire Jules-Verne offers the IB Diploma Programme in French. The IB courses offered are French, English, Spanish, history, geography, chemistry, biology, mathematics, visual arts, as well as the IB Diploma core: Theory of Knowledge (TDC), the Extended Essay and creativity, activity, service (CAS).

Indigenous studies 
Members of the Provincial Native Parents Committee, students and staff members have signed the "Aboriginal Education Enhancement Agreement" with the Chair of the CSF Board of Governors, the Minister of Education of British Columbia, and representatives of indigenous communities.

Parents of children with Indigenous heritage (First nations, Métis, Inuit, and unrecognized Indigenous people) can identify themselves on the CSF school registration forms, where the Indigenous ancestor can be a parent, grandparent, great-grandparent, etc. Funding provided by the Department of Education for this program is used to enhance academic, language and cultural programs for identified children. Parents are encouraged to engage in the process of developing a curriculum for their children.

École Virtuelle 
For the students not in IB, in grades 11-12, they are able to take online classes at École Virtuelle. These classes are not being offered in person, so the students take them online with other students in the CSF. The grade 11 classes include: Histoire et culture francophones 11, Sciences et citoyens 11, Aéronautique 11, Plein Air 11, and Mécanique de Vélo 11  The grade 12 classes include: Psychologie, Criminologie, Peuples autochtones de la Colombie-Britannique, Développement de médias numériques, Plein Air 12, and Production Vidéo.

Dual Accreditation Program with Educacentre College 
There is a dual accreditation program offered with the Educacentre College, which offers French online college courses for grade 11 and 12 students. If the student wishes to continue the program after high school in order to obtain the license or diploma of EPE, the courses taken will then be credited. Dual accreditation is a great way to deepen your knowledge of a profession and validate a career choice. The courses run from September to May and consist of 2 sessions (autumn/winter). For each of the completed courses, it is possible to obtain 4 course credits equivalent to a Grade 12 elective course. It takes an average of 5–8 hours of study/work per week. L'école virtuelle will cover registration costs as well as course costs. The courses offered with this program include: early childhood education, special educational assistance, health care worker, event management, holistic nutrition and Social Work Intervention.

Summer School 
These courses are for Grade 10, 11 or 12 CSF students who will be 18 years of age or younger before the start of classes. These courses allow: obtain credits for graduation (after a failure); increase the ballot mark for those who wish to do so; Complete the course to meet the requirements for a post-secondary program. Attendance: Students must log in daily, turn on their camera and participate in sessions. Schedule: 1/2 day (3h30minutes, with breaks of course) either 8:30 to 12:00 and/or 12:30 to 4:00. Schedules will be determined later based on registrations. Requirements: 80 to 120 hours of work over the summer. Access to a computer is required. CSF students will be able to keep their computer provided by the CSF during the summer period. Note that the device will be blocked if the student is removed from the class. There is no cost to taking summer classes, the Ministry of Education will fund all school-aged students who have a Personal Identification Number (PIN) issued by British Columbia and who, with their parents or legal guardians, are usual residents of British Columbia.

Diplomas

Athletics 
Teams are divided by age group: 7th grade team (grade 7), Bantam (grade 8), Junior (grades 9 & 10), and Senior (grades 11 & 12). École Secondaire Jules-Verne participates in the Greater Vancouver Independent Schools Athletics Association (GVISAA) for the majority of the sports except for track and field. For track and field, athletes compete with the Vancouver Secondary Schools Athletics Association (VSSAA). Jules-Verne has earned two first place titles in boys Junior and Senior soccer and one first place title in boys Senior hockey. Jules-Verne's boys Junior and Senior soccer teams have also made it to Provincials as well as the girls Senior volleyball team and some student athletes participating in Cross Country, Track and Field and Wrestling.

Athletic teams offered:

 Badminton
 Basketball
 Cross Country
 Hockey
 Soccer
 Track and Field
 Ultimate Frisbee
 Volleyball
 Wrestling

Clubs and activities 
Jules-Verne offers a wide variety of extra-curricular clubs such as:

 Comité Parrainage
Debate
Empreintes Committee
Gala Committee
Green club Committee
Homework-help club
Model United Nations (MUN) in French
 Partner Committee
Prom Committee
Robotics club
 SOGI
 Student council
 Student newspaper, called " L'Actualithé "
Yearbook Committee

Jules-Verne events include:

 First Nations celebrations
 Gala
Halloween dance
Pink shirt day
School elections for student council
 Talent show

Jules-Verne encourages their students to participate in activities and events organized by The Conseil Jeunesse which helps to connect the French-speaking youth of British Columbia. These activities are all in french and include:

 British Columbia’s Francophone Games (BCFG)
British Columbia Francophone Youth Parliament (BCFYP)
British Columbia – Quebec Exchange Program 
Canadian Francophone Games (JFC) – Team B.C.
Connecte, Youth Engagement Project
Crescendo
Francophone improvisation league (LIFC) 
Fusion
Linguistic Security Committee of BC
 Interactions 
 Leadership Camp
MONU Vancouver
North-Western Franco-Canadian Parliament (NWFCP)
Pancanadian Youth Forum (PYF)
Pancanadian Youth Parliament (PYP)
Provincial Volleyball Tournament
SAGA
Youth Network
Youth Radio
 24h

See also
Conseil scolaire francophone de la Colombie-Britannique
Jules Verne (author)

References

External links
École Secondaire Jules-Verne
Conseil Scolaire Francophone

High schools in British Columbia
French-language schools in British Columbia
Educational institutions established in 2009
2009 establishments in British Columbia